Ömer Ertuğrul Erbakan (born 27 December 1965) is a Turkish general. He is the current commander of Turkish Special Forces.

Biography 
He graduated from the Turkish Military Academy.

Erbakan, who started his military career as a commando, successfully completed his military specialization courses. He previously served in the special forces. In 2017, after Sivas 5th Infantry Training Brigade Commander Colonel Mehmet Kip was promoted to brigadier general and appointed to Ankara Central Command, he was appointed to the 5th Infantry Training Brigade Command. In 2019, he was promoted from brigadier general to major general following the Supreme Military Council. With the decision taken at the same council, he was appointed as the Special Forces Command from the 5th Infantry Training Brigade Command located in Sivas.

References 

Living people
Turkish Military Academy alumni
Turkish generals
1965 births